William Harris (17 June 1864 – 18 June 1949) was an English cricketer.  Harris was a right-handed batsman who bowled right-arm off break.  He was born in Kimberley, Nottinghamshire.

Harris played a single first-class match for Nottinghamshire against Sussex in 1886 at the County Ground, Hove.  In his only first-class match he scored 2 runs in his only innings, leaving him with a batting average of 2.00.

He died at Crofton Park, London on 18 June 1949.

References

External links
William Harris at Cricinfo
William Harris at CricketArchive

1864 births
1949 deaths
People from Kimberley, Nottinghamshire
Cricketers from Nottinghamshire
English cricketers
Nottinghamshire cricketers